Olive Byamukama is a former Ugandan-born English professional darts player who played in British Darts Organisation events.

Career
Byamukama reached the Last 16  of the World Masters in 2010. In 2011 she reached the Quarter-final of the BDO Gold Cup. She qualified for the 2017 BDO World Darts Championship, facing Fallon Sherrock in the last 16, which she lost 2–0.

World Championship results

BDO
 2017: Last 16 (lost to Fallon Sherrock 0–2) (sets)

External links
Profile and stats on Darts Database

Living people
Scottish darts players
English darts players
British Darts Organisation players
Female darts players
1975 births
Ugandan emigrants to the United Kingdom
Ugandan sportspeople
Sportspeople from Inverness
Sportspeople from London